Antônio Carlos Rocha Azevedo (born May 30, 1958) is a former international medley swimmer from Brazil, who competed at one Summer Olympics for his native country. At the 1972 Summer Olympics, in Munich, he swam the 200-metre and 400-metre individual medley, not reaching the finals.

References

1958 births
Living people
Brazilian male medley swimmers
Swimmers at the 1972 Summer Olympics
Olympic swimmers of Brazil
Swimmers from Rio de Janeiro (city)
20th-century Brazilian people